Nick Crittenden FRSA is a British writer and researcher who has worked in UK television drama for the BBC and ITV. He was awarded a Fellowship in Creative and Performing Arts by the UK's Arts and Humanities Research Council (AHRC) for research into feature film development. He was made a Fellow of the Royal Society of Arts (FRSA) for making a "prominent contribution to positive social change". He studied creative and critical writing at the University of East Anglia.

References

External links
 

Living people
Alumni of the University of East Anglia
Year of birth missing (living people)